John Sinrud (born August 30, 1967) is an American politician and a former Republican member of the Montana House of Representatives.  Sinrud was the Chair of the House Committee on Appropriations. He resides in  Belgrade, Montana. Sinrud graduated with a bachelor's degree in political science from Montana State University in 1998. During his final year in college, he was the president of the College Republicans.

References

1967 births
Living people
Republican Party members of the Montana House of Representatives
People from Edmonds, Washington
People from Belgrade, Montana